Alma Martinez (born 18 March 1953) is a Mexican-American actress, stage director, and professor of theatre. She is best known for her roles in film and television shows including the Peabody Award winning drama series The Bridge with Demián Bichir and Diane Kruger and Corridos: Tales of Passion & Revolution with Linda Ronstadt as well as performances on Broadway, Off-Broadway, regional theatre, Mexican and European stages.

Early career
In 1979, Martinez joined the Center Theatre Group production of Luis Valdez’s Zoot Suit. Her film debut was in Valdez's 1981 adaptation, the American classic Zoot Suit, launching a career that led to her induction into the Academy of Motion Picture Arts and Sciences in 2013. She has since been the lead actress in many of Valdez's projects in a collaboration that has spanned over 30 years. Australian director Fred Schepisi cast her in his American film debut, Barbarosa with Willie Nelson and Gary Busey. This was followed by Under Fire with Nick Nolte, Gene Hackman, Ed Harris and Jean Louis Trintignant. Martinez made a notable Broadway debut in In the Summer House directed by Joanne Akalaitis featuring Dianne Wiest, Frances Conroy and Liev Schreiber.

Film and television
Martinez has appeared in over 20 features and independent films including Born in East L.A. with Cheech Marin, For Greater Glory with Andy Garcia and Oscar Isaac, Strike One with Danny Trejo as well as Cake with Jennifer Aniston and Batman v Superman: Dawn of Justice. Her voiceover work includes the award-winning documentaries The Panama Deception and Food Chains. In 2017 she appeared as Rodney Alcala's mother Anna Alcala in the television film Dating Game Killer.

Theatre
Martinez has performed in over 100 major productions in the US, Mexico and Europe in venues that  include the Vivian Beaumont Theatre, Joyce Theatre, Mark Taper Forum, Oregon Shakespeare Festival, Pasadena Playhouse, Berkeley Repertory Theatre, Sundance Theatre Program, San Diego Repertory Theatre, Santa Cruz Shakespeare festival, South Coast Repertory Theatre, Arizona Theatre Company, Pennsylvania Stage, San Diego Repertory Theatre, Denver Center Theatre Company, Teatro Juan Ruiz De Alarcon (Mexico City), Teatro Calderon (Zacatecas, Mexico), Teatro Greco (Taormina, Italy), Castello Sforesco (Milan, Italy), Festival De Sant Arcangelo (Italy), Teatro Romano (Fiesolo, Italy), Oktoberfest (Munich, Germany) and Neiuwe Scene (Antwerp, Belgium), among others.

Filmography

Film

Television

References

External links 

20th-century American actresses
Living people
1953 births
Hispanic and Latino American actresses
21st-century American actresses
American film actresses
American stage actresses
American television actresses
People from Monclova
Actresses from Coahuila
Stanford University alumni
University of Southern California alumni
Whittier College alumni